Carlo Sacchi (1617–1706) was an Italian painter of the Baroque period.

He was born in Pavia and trained with a painter Carlo Antonio Rossi in Milan, then traveled to Rome before settling in Venice. There he imitated a style recalling Paolo Veronese. He was also an engraver.  Sacchi died in Pavia. One of his pupils was Carlo Girolamo Bersotti.

References

17th-century Italian painters
Italian male painters
18th-century Italian painters
Italian Baroque painters
Artists from Pavia
1617 births
1706 deaths
18th-century Italian male artists